Alison Darcy is a psychologist and technologist. She is the founder and President of Woebot, a company which provides digital therapeutics and behavioral health products.

Early life and education 
Darcy was an undergraduate student in Ireland at the University College Dublin, where she specialised in psychology. After completing her studies, Darcy became interested in computer science, so moved to London to work in an investment bank as a software developer. The investment bank was acquired by a larger bank during the dot com crash, leaving Darcy looking for new options. In particular, she was interested in combining her skills in technology with her talent for psychology, and worked with a charity to support people with eating disorders. At the time there was very little online support for people with mental health conditions, and accessing care was particularly difficult for people in rural communities. Working with one of her colleagues in software development, Darcy built an online support network, providing round-the-clock support to people who needed to talk. She eventually returned to University College Dublin for a graduate degree, and eventually a doctoral research programme in clinical psychology. Her research considered the effectiveness of group cognitive behavioural therapy. After a year in London, Darcy moved to the United States, where she joined Stanford University as a postdoctoral researcher in clinical psychology. At Stanford, she collaborated with Andrew Ng, and became interested in whether artificial intelligence can meaningfully help people with mental health conditions. In her clinical practise, Darcy was increasingly concerned that there was no continuity between leaving in patient care and entering the real world.

Research and career 
Darcy continued to research eating disorders, with a particular focus on anorexia nervosa. She recognised that very few clinicians had the appropriate training to treat patients with the condition. She pioneered the use of online learning methods to train clinicians. She became increasingly aware that to combine technology and psychology she would have to do it outside academia, so left to start her own company.

In 2017 Darcy founded Woebot, an artificial intelligence powered chatbot that helps users monitor their moods and manage their mental health. The board of Woebot is chaired by Ng. Darcy wants to make mental health services and the trainings of cognitive behavioural therapy accessible to all. In April 2020, Woebot added COVID-19 support, expanding its CBT support to include interpersonal psychotherapy.

Selected publications

References

External links 

Living people
Year of birth missing (living people)
Alumni of University College Dublin
Stanford University faculty
Mental health activists
Artificial intelligence ethicists
Clinical psychologists
Artificial intelligence researchers